‘’Not to be confused with Jones County School District (Mississippi) in Mississippi’’

The Jones County School District is a public school district in Jones County, Georgia, United States, based in Gray. It serves the communities of Gray, Haddock, and Macon.

Schools
The Jones County School District has four elementary schools, two middle schools, and one high school.

Pre-Kindergarten
Jones County Pre-Kindergarten

Elementary schools
Dames Ferry Elementary School
Gray Elementary School
Mattie Wells Elementary School 
Turner Woods Elementary

Middle schools
Clifton Ridge Middle School
Gray Station Middle School

High schools
Jones County High School

References

External links

School districts in Georgia (U.S. state)
Education in Jones County, Georgia